| highest attendance = 
| lowest attendance = 
| top point scorer = John Cooney (Ulster)115 points 
| top try scorer = Marcell Coetzee (Ulster)   Scott Penny  (Leinster)  Alex Wootton (Connacht)9 tries 
| website = www.pro14rugby.org
| prevseason = 2019–20
| nextseason = 
}}

The 2020–21 PRO14 (also known as the Guinness PRO14 for sponsorship reasons) was the twentieth season of the professional rugby union competition originally known as the Celtic League. It was the fourth season to be referred to as the PRO14 (the competition was named the Pro12 immediately prior to the addition of two South African teams).

Twelve teams competed in this season — four Irish teams: Connacht, Leinster, Munster and Ulster; two Italian teams: Benetton and Zebre; two Scottish teams: Edinburgh and Glasgow Warriors; and four Welsh teams: Cardiff Blues, Dragons, Ospreys and Scarlets. Neither of the two South African teams competed this season, with the Cheetahs unable to compete due to the COVID-19 pandemic, and the Southern Kings having entered into voluntary liquidation due to heavy financial losses.

Due to the delays experienced during the 2019–20 season as a result of the COVID-19 pandemic, the 2020–21 season started later than usual on the 2 October 2020. Leinster were the defending champions, having defeated Ulster 27–5 in the 2019–20 final to defend their title and complete a hat-trick of title wins.

It was won by Leinster who defeated Munster in the final on 27 March, it was their fourth consecutive Pro14 title and 8th overall.

On 23 December 2020 it was announced that the 2020-21 PRO14 season would conclude on 27 March 2021 after 16 rounds, and will be followed by the Pro14 Rainbow Cup, a competition featuring the four former South African Super Rugby sides, the Bulls, Lions, Sharks and Stormers. The Rainbow Cup would consist of two dual tournaments; one for the northern hemisphere teams and one for the four South African teams. The northern hemisphere tournament will run from 23 April to 19 June 2021.

Teams

Competition format

 League Stage

The twelve teams were split into two conferences of six teams, with each conference featuring two teams from Ireland and Wales plus one team from Italy and Scotland. To ensure a competitive balance, the teams were distributed approximately evenly between the conferences based upon their performance in the previous season.

The regular season consisted of 16 rounds, a home-and-away double round robin with same conference opponents (10 matches), and a home or away tie against each team in the other conference (6 matches). This represented a reduction from previous years, due to a delayed start and in order to make space for the PRO14 Rainbow Cup to be played following the conclusion of the season, which will introduce former Super Rugby teams into the Pro14 competitions.

 Final

The top-ranked team in each conference met in the final on 27 March 2021.

 Champions Cup Qualification

The organiser of the European Rugby Champions Cup, EPCR, has not yet confirmed the format for the 2021–22 tournament. If the usual qualification rules apply, at least seven PRO14 teams would qualify. The top three teams in each conference would qualify automatically. Previously, the winner of a playoff match between the fourth-ranked eligible teams in each conference became the seventh qualifying team. However, the organiser has confirmed that no play-off game will be used for European qualification this season and that rankings after round 16 will be used to determine which teams will qualify. The seventh qualifying team would be 
the fourth-ranked team which accumulated the most match points.

It is unclear if there will be any further qualifiers as it will influenced by the format of the 2021-22 tournament and, potentially, the final placings in the 2020-21 Champions Cup and Challenge Cup. In April 2021 EPCR confirmed a 24 team tournament featuring the top 8 teams.

Team changes

Ireland

Italy

Scotland

South Africa
Southern Kings entered liquidation in September 2020 and withdrew from the league, while the Cheetahs did not compete due to the COVID-19 pandemic. Following a vote by the South African Rugby Union, the four former South African Super Rugby sides, the Bulls, Lions, Sharks and Stormers, are likely to join an expanded tournament beginning in the 2021–22 season. The future of the Cheetahs is in doubt and they will likely be withdrawn from the PRO14.

Wales

Table

Match summary

Rounds 1 to 16
Fixtures for the first 11 rounds of matches were announced on 23 September 2020. Several matches were scheduled on Monday nights to avoid clashes with the extended international calendar. The remaining fixtures for rounds 12 to 16 were confirmed on the 25th of January 2021.

All times are local.

Round 1

Round 2

Round 3

Round 4

Round 5

Round 6

Round 7

Round 8

Round 4 (rescheduled match)

Round 6 (rescheduled match)

Round 9

Round 10

1872 Cup 1st round

Round 9 (rescheduled match)

Round 11

Round 9 (rescheduled match)

1872 Cup 2nd round

Round 14 (rescheduled match)

Round 11 (rescheduled match)

Round 9 (rescheduled match)

Round 8 (rescheduled match)

Round 5 (rescheduled match)

Round 8 (rescheduled match)

Round 5 (rescheduled match)

Round 12

Round 13

Round 14

Postponed due to the COVID-19 pandemic. Edinburgh were awarded four match points.

Round 15

Round 16

Round 11 (rescheduled match)

Round 7 (rescheduled match)

Play-offs

Final

Referees
Pro14 2018–19 14-man referee elite squad: (number of matches refereed):

  Mike Adamson (SRU) – (21)
  Stuart Berry (SARU) – (14)
  Andrew Brace (IRFU) – (35)
  George Clancy (IRFU) – (102)
  Ian Davies (WRU) – (72)
  Sean Gallagher (IRFU) – (9)
  Quinton Immelman (SARU) – (10)
  Dan Jones (WRU) – (14)
  John Lacey (IRFU) – (70)
  Lloyd Linton (SRU) – (21)
  Marius Mitrea (FIR) – (78)
  Frank Murphy (IRFU) – (14)
  Andrea Piardi (FIR) – (1)
  Nigel Owens (WRU) – (166)
  Ben Whitehouse (WRU) – (46)

Note: Additional referees are used throughout the season, selected from a select development squad.

Attendances by club

Highest attendances

End of Season Awards

PRO14 Dream Team
The 2020–21 Pro14 Dream team is:

Award winners
The 2020–21 Pro14 award winners were:

Leading scorers
Note: Flags to the left of player names indicate national team as has been defined under World Rugby eligibility rules, or primary nationality for players who have not yet earned international senior caps. Players may hold one or more non-WR nationalities.

Most points

Most tries

Notes

References

External links
Official website

 
2020–21 in European rugby union leagues
2020-21
2020–21 in Irish rugby union
2020–21 in Italian rugby union
2020–21 in Scottish rugby union
2020–21 in Welsh rugby union
2020 in South African rugby union
2021 in South African rugby union